Presidential elections were held in Gran Colombia in 1825, with Congress certifying the results the following year. The result was a victory for Simón Bolívar, who received 582 of the 608 votes. Francisco de Paula Santander was elected Vice President.

Electoral system
The 1821 constitution provided for a system where Provincial Assemblies elected the President and Vice President. If no candidate received a majority of the vote, an election would be held in the Congress.

Results

President

Vice President

References

Colombia
Presidential elections in Colombia
President